Leandro Miguel Álvarez (born 4 June 1981) is an Argentine footballer.

Club career
Álvarez previously played for San Lorenzo, Tiro Federal and Talleres de Córdoba in the Primera División de Argentina.

Olympiakos Volou 1937 F.C.

In 2008, he moved to Olympiakos Volou 1937 F.C. In 2010-2011 season he helped his team to qualify for the Europa League for the first time in their history and finish fifth in their league. He completed this season having made 31 appearances but he did not manage to score any goal in the league. In summer 2011 he was released, because Olympiakos Volou was relegated to Delta Ethniki for their involvement in the match fixing scandal.

Asteras Tripolis F.C.

Later, he moved to Asteras Tripolis F.C. He made his debut against Olympiakos F.C. in a 2-0 home win. The next season, he scored his first goal against AEK Athens F.C. in a 1-0 away win.

References

1981 births
Living people
Argentine footballers
Argentine expatriate footballers
Club Almagro players
San Lorenzo de Almagro footballers
Tiro Federal footballers
Talleres de Córdoba footballers
Apollon Limassol FC players
Olympiacos Volos F.C. players
Asteras Tripolis F.C. players
Apollon Smyrnis F.C. players
Argentine Primera División players
Super League Greece players
Cypriot First Division players
Sportspeople from Buenos Aires Province
Expatriate footballers in Cyprus
Expatriate footballers in Greece
Association football midfielders